Chembuthara or Chembutra is a small village in Kerala, India, known for its Makarachowa festival.  It is situated about 11 km away from Thrissur center.  It is located by the side of NH 544.

Temples
Chembuthara Kodungallurkavu temple is located just 500m away from the NH and its owned by the Chembuthara Kodugallorekavu Devaswam' managed by Ezhavas.  Thousands of devotees visit this temple monthly.

Festivals
Chembuthara 'Makarachowa' is a parade of elephants with percussion music and fire works. Every year on the first Tuesday of Malayalam month 'Makaram', the Makarachowa festival is celebrated.

Tourism
Local tourist spots include Pattathipaara, a natural waterfall. Also nearby is Pattikkad which is one of the developed village Panchayath in Thrissur district.  A higher secondary school and clinic is situated Pattikkad. In between Pattikkad and Chembuthara, Peechi Road is located. Peechi Road is the turning to Peechi Dam, KFRI etc.

Also there is a Sree Krishna temple called 'Sree Krishna Temple Chembuthara'. It is owned by the Vadakkedesam Pooracommitee. Tens of hundreds of devotees visits this temple yearly. Festivals held within this temple include sree Krishna jayanthi and prathishtadinam.

The house of St. Mary (Vishudha Maraiam Veedu), a home for the homeless and St. Joseph Chapel  are just behind an Indian coffee house at Chembuthara on HWY 544 .  It runs an ambulance service - free of cost for the poor. Every Saturday there is holy Mass  at 0730 AM. The house of St. Mary runs a free  community kitchen. From 1200 to 0200 PM,  free food is provided for all who come there.

Education
 Sree Badhra Vidya Mandhir, Chembuthara

Notable peoples
 Vishnu Raj Menon

See also
 Pattikkad, Thrissur
 Thrissur
 Thrissur District

References

Villages in Thrissur district